Fremont Center is a hamlet in Sullivan County, New York, United States. Fremont Center has a post office with ZIP code 12736.

References

Hamlets in Sullivan County, New York
Hamlets in New York (state)